Derzky was the fourth ship of the  of the Soviet Navy.

Construction and career 
The ship was built at Zhdanov Shipyard in Leningrad and was launched on 4 February 1960 and commissioned into the Northern Fleet on 30 December 1961.

On January 12, 1962, the ship entered the Northern Fleet of the Soviet Navy. On May 19, 1966, the Derzky was reclassified into a large missile ship (BRK).

In the period from November 20, 1967 to April 22, 1972, it was modernized and rebuilt according to Project 57-A at the shipyard named after V.I. A. A. Zhdanov. On October 20, 1970, the ship was reclassified as a large anti-submarine ship.

In the period from 4 to 9 August 1973, the ship visited Havana (Cuba). On August 7, 1977, the ship was withdrawn from the fleet, mothballed and put on hold in Sayda-Guba.

On April 19, 1990, the destroyer was excluded from the Soviet Navy in connection with the delivery to the OFI for disarmament, dismantling and sale. On October 1, 1990, the crew of the ship was disbanded, and the ship was turned into a target ship.

References

In Russian

External links 

 
 
 Gallery of the ship. Navsource. Retrieved 11 August 2021

Ships built at Severnaya Verf
Kanin-class destroyers
1960 ships
Cold War destroyers of the Soviet Union